{{Speciesbox
| image = 
| image_caption = 
| genus = Cyclanthera
| species = tenuisepala
| authority = Cogn.
| synonyms = 
 Cyclanthera elegans Cogn., 1877
 Cyclanthera elegans var. elegans
 Cyclanthera elegans var. genuina Cyclanthera elegans var. grandifolia Cyclanthera elegans var. obtusiloba Cyclanthera elegans var. warmingii Cyclanthera tonduzii Cogn. ex T.Durand & Pittier
}}Cyclanthera tenuisepala'' is a species of flowering plants in the family Cucurbitaceae found in Costa Rica.

References

External links

tenuisepala
Plants described in 1891
Flora of Costa Rica
Taxa named by Alfred Cogniaux